Mike Richmond may refer to:

Mike Richmond (musician) (born 1948), American jazz bassist
Mike Richmond (speed skater) (born 1960)